Caloreas apocynoglossa is a moth of the family Choreutidae. It is known from North America, including California.

References

Choreutidae
Moths described in 1976